Federico Wilde (born 1909, date of death unknown) was an Argentine football forward who played for Argentina in the 1934 FIFA World Cup. He also played for Unión de Santa Fe.

References

External links
FIFA profile

1909 births
Argentine footballers
Argentina international footballers
Association football forwards
Unión de Santa Fe footballers
1934 FIFA World Cup players
Year of death missing
Argentine people of German descent